Temple Mountain or temple mountain may refer to:

Places
Temple Mountain (Idaho), a mountain in  Boundary County, Idaho
Temple Mountain (New Hampshire), a mountain in Hillsborough County, New Hampshire
Temple Mountain Ski Area, a former downhill ski area in New Hampshire
Temple Mountain (Utah), a mountain in Emery County, Utah

Other
Temple mountain, a scheme for temple construction in Khmer architecture
Temple Mountain Member, the lowest geologic strata within the Chinle Formation

See also 
Mount Temple (Alberta)
Temple Mount